The Teluk Gadong Komuter station is a commuter train halt located in Klang and served by the Port Klang Line of the KTM Komuter railway system.

The Teluk Gadong Komuter station was built to cater traffic in suburban area with the similar name called Teluk Gadong, located south-west from township of Klang. The station is located close to residential area and is within walking distance. The station usually busy during rush hours as it is used by residents there to reach their workplaces.

Taman Gembira is the nearest residential properties to this station.

External links
Teluk Gadong KTM Komuter Station

Railway stations in Selangor
Rapid transit stations in Selangor
Port Klang Line